Katrina Merriweather (born August 14, 1979) is an American basketball coach who is currently the head women's basketball coach at the University of Memphis.

Coaching career 
Merriweather began her coaching career as a graduate assistant at her alma mater Cincinnati in 2001. After spending one season with the Bearcats, she spent a season at UIC as an assistant before joining Purdue as an assistant coach and recruiting coordinator. Merriweather was suspended indefinitely during the 2005–06 season after she admitted to typing, correcting, and revising a paper for a point guard on the basketball team during the season, as well as making 105 impermissible phone calls to recruits. As a result, Purdue was placed on probation for the next two seasons and Merriweather did not return to Purdue after the 2005–06 season.

Wright State 
After four seasons away from college basketball, Merriweather was hired as an assistant coach at Wright State in 2010. She added recruiting coordinator duties in 2012.

Merriweather was promoted to head coach in 2016 after Mike Bradbury departed to accept the head coaching position at New Mexico. At Wright State, she led the program to their first ever NCAA tournament win while also winning three Horizon League regular season titles and three Horizon League coach of the year awards.

Memphis 
Merriweather was named the head coach at Memphis on March 29, 2021, the 12th head coach in program history.

Head coaching record

References

External links 
 
 Memphis profile
 Wright State profile

1979 births
Living people
Basketball players from Indianapolis
Basketball coaches from Indiana
Cincinnati Bearcats women's basketball players
Cincinnati Bearcats women's basketball coaches
UIC Flames women's basketball coaches
Purdue Boilermakers women's basketball coaches
Wright State Raiders women's basketball coaches
Memphis Tigers women's basketball coaches